Laurel High School in Laurel, Montana opened in 1908, with W.A. Longley serving as the first principal. The original high school was located on First Avenue between Ninth Street and Seventh Street. It was known as "The Old North School". The school, in its present location on Eighth Street, was constructed in 1962 and the Old North School was demolished in 1969. The demolition inspired Laurel's graduating class to lead one of the largest public rallies in the history of Montana and the Northwest region of the United States.

Extracurricular activities 
Laurel High School offers activities such as boys & girls basketball, cheerleading, cross country, football, girls & boys soccer, girls & boys golf, speech, drama, debate, softball, track & field, volleyball, and wrestling.

The following clubs are also available at Laurel: Academic Challenge, Art Club, Business Professionals of America, Chess Club, Drama Club, Future Farmers of America, Locomotive Express Coffee, National Honors Society, Outdoors Club, Poetry Club, STAND, Spanish Club, and Student Council.

Montana High School Association State Championships (45)
Information is from the Montana High School Association.
 Boys Basketball – 1969, 1972, 2010, 2015
 Boys Football – 1999, 2002, 2020
 Boys Golf – 1974, 1976, 1979, 1980, 1982, 1997, 1998, 1999, 2017, 2018, 2019, 2021, 2022
 Boys Track & Field  1978, 1979, 1980, 1991, 2019
 Boys Wrestling – 1967, 1985, 1998, 2011
 Girls Basketball – 2006, 2013
 Girls Cross Country – 1993
 Girls Golf – 2006, 2018, 2019. 2020 , 2021
 Girls Softball – 1971, 2006
 Girls Volleyball – 2012
 Girls Soccer – 2014, 2017, 2019, 2020, 2021

In Montana, there are four classes of schools, based on the size of the student body. From smallest to largest, they are Class C, B, A, and AA. Laurel competes in the A class. The class A is divided into four regional divisions:
 North Western A: Browning, Columbia Falls, Libby, Polson, Ronan, and Whitefish
 South Western A: Dillon, Butte Central, Corvallis, Frenchtown, Hamilton, and Stevensville
 South Eastern A: Billings Central, Laurel, Hardin, Livingston, East Helena, and Lockwood
 North Eastern A: Miles City, Glendive, Sidney, Lewistown, and Havre

Notes and references

Public high schools in Montana
Schools in Yellowstone County, Montana
Schools accredited by the Northwest Accreditation Commission
1908 establishments in Montana
Educational institutions established in 1908